Amazing Wedding Cakes is an American reality television series on WE tv that debuted on September 7, 2008. The series follows several bakers from around the country as they create high-end edible art wedding cakes.

Cast
It has featured the following bakeries:
 Cake Alchemy
 Cake Atelier
 Cake Divas
 Cake Girls
 Christopher Garren's Cakes
 Merci Beaucoup Cakes
 The Cake Artist
 White Flower Cake Shoppe
 Gateaux Inc.

References

2000s American reality television series
2010s American reality television series
2008 American television series debuts
2011 American television series endings
English-language television shows
Food reality television series
Wedding television shows
Media about cakes